Nodopelta heminoda is a species of sea snail, a marine gastropod mollusk in the family Peltospiridae.

Description
Nodopelta heminoda is a non-documented species.

Distribution

References

Peltospiridae
Gastropods described in 1989